The 2020–21 Los Angeles Clippers season was the 51st season of the franchise in the National Basketball Association (NBA), their 43rd season in Southern California, and their 37th season in Los Angeles.

On September 28, 2020, the Clippers and head coach Doc Rivers mutually agreed to part ways after seven seasons with the team. On October 20, 2020, the Clippers promoted Tyronn Lue as their new head coach.

The Clippers made the deepest playoff run in their 51-year history. They advanced to the Conference Finals for the first time in franchise history after defeating the Utah Jazz in six games in the Conference Semifinals. Their run would come to an end against the Phoenix Suns (who were led by former Clippers star Chris Paul) in the Conference Finals, losing in six games.

The Clippers were the first team to come back from down 2-0 twice in the same playoffs, denying the Dallas Mavericks and the Utah Jazz a chance at a 3-0 series lead, which no team in NBA history has ever come back from in a playoff series.

Draft

Roster

Roster notes
 Guard Rajon Rondo is the 30th former Lakers player to play for the Clippers. 
 Center DeMarcus Cousins signed with the Lakers last season but got injured before the start of season and never actually got to play wearing the Lakers uniform.

Standings

Division

Conference

Notes
 z – Clinched home court advantage for the entire playoffs
 c – Clinched home court advantage for the conference playoffs
 y – Clinched division title
 x – Clinched playoff spot
 pb – Clinched play-in spot
 o – Eliminated from playoff contention
 * – Division leader

Game log

Preseason

|- style="background:#fcc;"
| 1
| December 11
| @ L.A. Lakers
| 
| Paul George (10)
| Ivica Zubac (10)
| 4 tied (2)
| Staples Center
| 0–1
|- style="background:#fcc;"
| 2
| December 13
| @ L.A. Lakers
| 
| Lou Williams (12)
| Ivica Zubac (6)
| Terance Mann (5)
| Staples Center
| 0–2
|- style="background:#fcc;"
| 3
| December 17
| Utah
| 
| Paul George (16)
| Nicolas Batum (8)
| Paul George (5)
| Staples Center
| 0–3

Regular season

|-style="background:#cfc;"
| 1
| December 22
| @ L. A. Lakers
| 
| Paul George (33)
| 4 tied (6)
| Nicolas Batum (6)
| Staples Center0
| 1–0
|-style="background:#cfc;"
| 2
| December 25
| @ Denver
| 
| Paul George (23)
| Nicolas Batum (10)
| Paul George (9)
| Ball Arena0
| 2–0
|-style="background:#fcc;"
| 3
| December 27
| Dallas
| 
| Paul George (15)
| Serge Ibaka (9)
| Paul George (4)
| Staples Center0
| 2–1
|-style="background:#cfc;"
| 4
| December 29
| Minnesota
| 
| Lou Williams (20)
| Serge Ibaka (8)
| George, Williams (5)
| Staples Center0
| 3–1
|-style="background:#cfc;"
| 5
| December 30
| Portland
| 
| Kawhi Leonard (28)
| Paul George (10)
| George, Leonard (7)
| Staples Center0
| 4–1

|-style="background:#fcc;"
| 6
| January 1
| @ Utah
| 
| Paul George (25)
| Kawhi Leonard (16)
| Kawhi Leonard (9)
| Vivint Smart Home ArenaLimited Seating
| 4–2
|-style="background:#cfc;"
| 7
| January 3
| @ Phoenix
| 
| Paul George (39)
| Patrick Beverley (9)
| Reggie Jackson (6)
| Phoenix Suns Arena0
| 5–2
|-style="background:#fcc;"
| 8
| January 5
| San Antonio
| 
| Kawhi Leonard (30)
| Nicolas Batum (9)
| Kawhi Leonard (10)
| Staples Center0
| 5–3
|-style="background:#cfc;"
| 9
| January 6
| @ Golden State
| 
| George, Leonard (21)
| Serge Ibaka (14)
| Kawhi Leonard (4)
| Chase Center0
| 6–3
|-style="background:#fcc;"
| 10
| January 8
| @ Golden State
| 
| Paul George (25)
| Serge Ibaka (7)
| Paul George (7)
| Chase Center0
| 6–4
|-style="background:#cfc;"
| 11
| January 10
| Chicago
| 
| Kawhi Leonard (35)
| 3 tied (7)
| Paul George (9)
| Staples Center0
| 7–4
|-style="background:#cfc;"
| 12
| January 13
| New Orleans
| 
| Kawhi Leonard (28)
| Ivica Zubac (7)
| Kawhi Leonard (9)
| Staples Center0
| 8–4
|-style="background:#cfc;"
| 13
| January 15
| @ Sacramento
| 
| Kawhi Leonard (27)
| Ivica Zubac (7)
| Kennard, Leonard (7)
| Golden 1 Center0
| 9–4
|-style="background:#cfc;"
| 14
| January 17
| Indiana
| 
| 3 tied (20)
| 3 tied  (7)
| Patrick Beverley (6)
| Staples Center0
| 10–4
|-style="background:#cfc;"
| 15
| January 20
| Sacramento
| 
| Kawhi Leonard (32)
| Ivica Zubac (12)
| Paul George (12)
| Staples Center0
| 11–4
|-style="background:#cfc;"
| 16
| January 22
| Oklahoma City
| 
| Kawhi Leonard (31)
| Serge Ibaka (11)
| Lou Williams (8)
| Staples Center0
| 12–4
|-style="background:#cfc;"
| 17
| January 24
| Oklahoma City
| 
| Kawhi Leonard (34)
| Ivica Zubac (11)
| Kawhi Leonard (8)
| Staples Center0
| 13–4
|-style="background:#fcc;"
| 18
| January 26
| @ Atlanta
| 
| Reggie Jackson (20)
| Ivica Zubac (10)
| Reggie Jackson (8)
| State Farm Arena0
| 13–5
|-style="background:#cfc;"
| 19
| January 28
| @ Miami
| 
| Nicolas Batum (18)
| Serge Ibaka (13)
| Reggie Jackson (6)
| American Airlines Arena0
| 14–5
|-style="background:#cfc;"
| 20
| January 29
| @ Orlando
| 
| Paul George (26)
| George, Ibaka (9)
| Paul George (5)
| Amway Center3,763
| 15–5
|-style="background:#cfc;"
| 21
| January 31
| @ New York
| 
| Kawhi Leonard (28)
| Paul George (8)
| George, Williams (5)
| Madison Square Garden0
| 16–5

|-style="background:#fcc;"
| 22
| February 2
| @ Brooklyn
| 
| Kawhi Leonard (33)
| Serge Ibaka (10)
| Paul George (6)
| Barclays Center0
| 16–6
|-style="background:#cfc;"
| 23
| February 3
| @ Cleveland
| 
| Paul George (36)
| Ivica Zubac (16)
| Paul George (6)
| Rocket Mortgage FieldHouse0
| 17–6
|-style="background:#fcc;"
| 24
| February 5
| Boston
| 
| Kawhi Leonard (28)
| Kawhi Leonard (11)
| Lou Williams (6)
| Staples Center0
| 17–7
|-style="background:#fcc;"
| 25
| February 7
| Sacramento
| 
| Lou Williams (23)
| Ivica Zubac (14)
| Lou Williams (5)
| Staples Center0
| 17–8
|-style="background:#cfc;"
| 26
| February 10
| @ Minnesota
| 
| Kawhi Leonard (36)
| Nicolas Batum (10)
| Kawhi Leonard (5)
| Target Center0
| 18–8
|-style="background:#cfc;"
| 27
| February 12
| @ Chicago
| 
| Kawhi Leonard (33)
| Batum, Leonard (6)
| Lou Williams (5)
| United Center0
| 19–8
|-style="background:#cfc;"
| 28
| February 14
| Cleveland
| 
| Lou Williams (30)
| Serge Ibaka (9)
| Lou Williams (10)
| Staples Center0
| 20–8
|-style="background:#cfc;"
| 29
| February 15
| Miami
| 
| Marcus Morris Sr. (32)
| Serge Ibaka (9)
| Lou Williams (10)
| Staples Center0
| 21–8
|-style="background:#fcc;"
| 30
| February 17
| Utah
| 
| Lou Williams (16)
| Ivica Zubac (9)
| Lou Williams (6)
| Staples Center0
| 21–9
|-style="background:#cfc;"
| 31
| February 19
| Utah
| 
| Kawhi Leonard (29)
| Serge Ibaka (9)
| Paul George (5)
| Staples Center0
| 22–9
|-style="background:#fcc;"
| 32
| February 21
| Brooklyn
| 
| Paul George (34)
| Kawhi Leonard (13)
| Paul George (7)
| Staples Center0
| 22–10
|-style="background:#cfc;"
| 33
| February 23
| Washington
| 
| Kawhi Leonard (32)
| Ivica Zubac (13)
| Batum, Leonard, Morris Sr. (4)
| Staples Center0
| 23–10
|-style="background:#fcc;"
| 34
| February 25
| @ Memphis
| 
| Kawhi Leonard (17)
| George, Ibaka (7)
| Kawhi Leonard (7)
| FedEx Forum1,896
| 23–11
|-style="background:#cfc;"
| 35
| February 26
| @ Memphis
| 
| Kawhi Leonard (30)
| Kawhi Leonard (9)
| Paul George (8)
| FedEx Forum2,039
| 24–11
|-style="background:#fcc;"
| 36
| February 28
| @ Milwaukee
| 
| Kawhi Leonard (25)
| Serge Ibaka (11)
| Paul George (7)
| Fiserv Forum1,800
| 24–12

|-style="background:#fcc;"
| 37
| March 2
| @ Boston
| 
| Paul George (32)
| Ivica Zubac (10)
| Reggie Jackson (7)
| TD Garden0
| 24–13
|-style="background:#fcc;"
| 38
| March 4
| @ Washington
| 
| Kawhi Leonard (22)
| Ivica Zubac (13)
| Nicolas Batum (5)
| Capital One Arena0
| 24–14
|-style="background:#cfc;"
| 39
| March 11
| Golden State
| 
| Kawhi Leonard (28)
| Serge Ibaka (14)
| Paul George (5)
| Staples Center0
| 25–14
|-style="background:#fcc;"
| 40
| March 14
| @ New Orleans
| 
| Kawhi Leonard (23)
| Terance Mann (7)
| Luke Kennard (4)
| Smoothie King Center3,700
| 25–15
|-style="background:#cfc;"
| 41
| March 15
| @ Dallas
| 
| Kawhi Leonard (22)
| Ivica Zubac (11)
| Kawhi Leonard (7)
| American Airlines Center3,945
| 26–15
|-style="background:#fcc;"
| 42
| March 17
| @ Dallas
| 
| Paul George (28)
| George, Leonard, Morris Sr., Zubac (7)
| Kawhi Leonard (7)
| American Airlines Center3,975
| 26–16
|-style="background:#cfc;"
| 43
| March 20
| Charlotte
| 
| Paul George (21)
| Batum, George, Jackson, Zubac (5)
| Paul George (10)
| Staples Center0
| 27–16
|-style="background:#cfc;"
| 44
| March 22
| Atlanta
| 
| Kawhi Leonard (25)
| Terance Mann (10)
| Paul George (7)
| Staples Center0
| 28–16
|-style="background:#cfc;"
| 45
| March 24
| @ San Antonio
| 
| Kawhi Leonard (25)
| Ivica Zubac (8)
| Batum, George, Jackson (4)
| AT&T Center3,224
| 29–16
|-style="background:#cfc;"
| 46
| March 25
| @ San Antonio
| 
| Reggie Jackson (28)
| George, Zubac (13)
| George, Jackson (4)
| AT&T Center3,225
| 30–16
|-style="background:#cfc;"
| 47
| March 27
| Philadelphia
| 
| Kawhi Leonard (28)
| Ivica Zubac (11)
| Paul George (9)
| Staples Center0
| 31–16
|-style="background:#cfc;"
| 48
| March 29
| Milwaukee
| 
| Marcus Morris Sr. (25)
| Leonard, Zubac (9)
| Kawhi Leonard (8)
| Staples Center0
| 32–16
|-style="background:#fcc;"
| 49
| March 30
| Orlando
| 
| Kawhi Leonard (28)
| Ivica Zubac (13)
| Reggie Jackson (7)
| Staples Center0
| 32–17

|-style="background:#fcc;"
| 50
| April 1
| Denver
| 
| Kawhi Leonard (24)
| Kawhi Leonard (12)
| Paul George (5)
| Staples Center0
| 32–18
|-style="background:#cfc;"
| 51
| April 4
| L. A. Lakers
| 
| Marcus Morris (22)
| Kawhi Leonard (10)
| Kawhi Leonard (8)
| Staples Center0
| 33–18
|-style="background:#cfc;"
| 52
| April 6
| Portland
| 
| Paul George (36)
| Kawhi Leonard (11)
| Kawhi Leonard (12)
| Staples Center0
| 34–18
|-style="background:#cfc;"
| 53
| April 8
| Phoenix
| 
| Paul George (33)
| Paul George (7)
| Rajon Rondo (9)
| Staples Center0
| 35–18
|-style="background:#cfc;"
| 54
| April 9
| Houston
| 
| Kawhi Leonard (31)
| Ivica Zubac (7)
| Terance Mann (9)
| Staples Center0
| 36–18
|-style="background:#cfc;"
| 55
| April 11
| Detroit
| 
| Marcus Morris (33)
| Ivica Zubac (10)
| Paul George (9)
| Staples Center0
| 37–18
|-style="background:#cfc;"
| 56
| April 13
| @ Indiana
| 
| Paul George (36)
| Paul George (8)
| George, Jackson, Mann, Rondo (2)
| Bankers Life Fieldhouse0
| 38–18
|-style="background:#cfc;"
| 57
| April 14
| @ Detroit
| 
| Reggie Jackson (29)
| Ivica Zubac (13)
| Rajon Rondo (4)
| Little Caesars Arena750
| 39–18
|-style="background:#fcc;"
| 58
| April 16
| @ Philadelphia
| 
| Paul George (37)
| Paul George (9)
| Rajon Rondo (8)
| Wells Fargo Center4,094
| 39–19
|-style="background:#cfc;"
| 59
| April 18
| Minnesota
| 
| Paul George (23)
| Kawhi Leonard (11)
| Kawhi Leonard (18)
| Staples Center1,734
| 40–19
|-style="background:#cfc;"
| 60
| April 20
| @ Portland
| 
| Paul George (33)
| Paul George (11)
| Rajon Rondo (7)
| Moda Center0
| 41–19
|-style="background:#cfc;"
| 61
| April 21
| Memphis
| 
| Luke Kennard (28)
| DeMarcus Cousins (10)
| Ferrell, Mann (7)
| Staples Center1,782
| 42–19
|-style="background:#cfc;"
| 62
| April 23
| @ Houston
| 
| Paul George (33)
| Paul George (14)
| Batum, Jackson (5)
| Toyota Center3,313
| 43–19
|-style="background:#fcc;"
| 63
| April 26
| @ New Orleans
| 
| Terance Mann (17)
| DeMarcus Cousins (11)
| Jackson, Rondo (5)
| Smoothie King Center3,700
| 43–20
|-style="background:#fcc;"
| 64
| April 28
| @ Phoenix
| 
| Paul George (25)
| Paul George (10)
| Paul George (10)
| Phoenix Suns Arena5,917
| 43–21

|-style="background:#fcc;"
| 65
| May 1
| Denver
| 
| Paul George (20)
| Paul George (7)
| Paul George (7)
| Staples Center2,818
| 43–22
|-style="background:#cfc;"
| 66
| May 4
| Toronto
| 
| George, Morris Sr. (22)
| Paul George (9)
| Jackson, Leonard, Rondo (5)
| Staples Center1,714
| 44–22
|-style="background:#cfc;"
| 67
| May 6
| L. A. Lakers
| 
| Paul George (24)
| Leonard, Zubac (8)
| Kawhi Leonard (6)
| Staples Center3,275
| 45–22
|-style="background:#fcc;"
| 68
| May 9
| New York
| 
| Kawhi Leonard (29)
| George, Rondo, Zubac (8)
| Rajon Rondo (8)
| Staples Center2,578
| 45–23
|-style="background:#cfc;"
| 69
| May 11
| @ Toronto
| 
| Leonard, Mann (20)
| Ivica Zubac (10)
| Batum, George, Rondo (4)
| Amalie ArenaLimited seating
| 46–23
|-style="background:#cfc;"
| 70
| May 13
| @ Charlotte
| 
| Paul George (22)
| Ivica Zubac (11)
| Kawhi Leonard (9)
| Spectrum Center4,442
| 47–23
|-style="background:#fcc;"
| 71
| May 14
| @ Houston
| 
| Luke Kennard (23)
| Serge Ibaka (7)
| Rajon Rondo (13)
| Toyota Center3,803
| 47–24
|-style="background:#fcc;"
| 72
| May 16
| @ Oklahoma City
| 
| Terance Mann (19)
| Daniel Oturu (12)
| Beverley, Patterson (4)
| Chesapeake Energy Arena0
| 47–25

Playoffs 

|-style="background:#fcc;"
| 1
| May 22
| Dallas
| 
| Kawhi Leonard (26)
| Kawhi Leonard (10)
| George, Leonard (5)
| Staples Center6,117
| 0–1
|-style="background:#fcc;"
| 2
| May 25
| Dallas
| 
| Kawhi Leonard (41)
| Paul George (12)
| Rajon Rondo (7)
| Staples Center6,885
| 0–2
|-style="background:#cfc;"
| 3
| May 28
| @ Dallas
| 
| Kawhi Leonard (36)
| Kawhi Leonard (8)
| George, Jackson (4)
| American Airlines Center17,705
| 1–2
|-style="background:#cfc;"
| 4
| May 30
| @ Dallas
| 
| Kawhi Leonard (29)
| Kawhi Leonard (10)
| Rajon Rondo (4)
| American Airlines Center17,761
| 2–2
|-style="background:#fcc;"
| 5
| June 2
| Dallas
| 
| Paul George (23)
| Ivica Zubac (11)
| George, Rondo (6)
| Staples Center7,428
| 2–3
|-style="background:#cfc;"
| 6
| June 4
| @ Dallas
| 
| Kawhi Leonard (45)
| Paul George (13)
| Paul George (6)
| American Airlines Center18,324
| 3–3
|-style="background:#cfc;"
| 7
| June 6
| Dallas
| 
| Kawhi Leonard (28)
| Kawhi Leonard (10)
| Paul George (10)
| Staples Center7,342
| 4–3

|-style="background:#fcc;"
| 1
| June 8
| @ Utah
| 
| Kawhi Leonard (23)
| Paul George (11)
| Rajon Rondo (5)
| Vivint Arena18,007
| 0–1
|-style="background:#fcc;"
| 2
| June 10
| @ Utah
| 
| Reggie Jackson (29)
| George, Morris Sr. (10)
| Paul George (6)
| Vivint Arena18,007
| 0–2
|-style="background:#cfc;"
| 3
| June 12
| Utah
| 
| Kawhi Leonard (34)
| Kawhi Leonard (12)
| George, Leonard (5)
| Staples Center8,185
| 1–2
|-style="background:#cfc;"
| 4
| June 14
| Utah
| 
| George, Leonard (31)
| Paul George (9)
| Batum, George (4)
| Staples Center8,474
| 2–2
|-style="background:#cfc;"
| 5
| June 16
| @ Utah
| 
| Paul George (37)
| Paul George (16)
| Paul George (5)
| Vivint Arena18,007
| 3–2
|-style="background:#cfc;"
| 6
| June 18
| Utah
| 
| Terance Mann (39)
| Paul George (9)
| Reggie Jackson (10)
| Staples Center17,105
| 4–2

|-style="background:#fcc;"
| 1
| June 20
| @ Phoenix
| 
| Paul George (34)
| Nicolas Batum (10)
| Rajon Rondo (7)
| Phoenix Suns Arena16,583
| 0–1
|-style="background:#fcc;"
| 2
| June 22
| @ Phoenix
| 
| Paul George (26)
| Ivica Zubac (11)
| Paul George (6)
| Phoenix Suns Arena16,645
| 0–2
|-style="background:#cfc;"
| 3
| June 24
| Phoenix
| 
| Paul George (27)
| Ivica Zubac (16)
| Paul George (8)
| Staples Center17,222
| 1–2
|-style="background:#fcc;"
| 4
| June 26
| Phoenix
| 
| Paul George (23)
| Paul George (16)
| Paul George (6)
| Staples Center18,222
| 1–3
|-style="background:#cfc;"
| 5
| June 28
| @ Phoenix
| 
| Paul George (41)
| Paul George (13)
| Paul George (6)
| Phoenix Suns Arena16,664
| 2–3
|-style="background:#fcc;"
| 6
| June 30
| Phoenix
| 
| Marcus Morris Sr. (26)
| George, Morris Sr. (9)
| Reggie Jackson (8)
| Staples Center18,495
| 2–4

Transactions

Trades

Free agency

Re-signed

Additions

Subtractions

Notes

References

Los Angeles Clippers seasons
Los Angeles Clippers
Los Angeles Clippers
Los Angeles Clippers
Clippers
Clippers